Miss Jones and Son is a comedy series first broadcast on ITV in 1977. It starred Paula Wilcox, Christopher Beeny, Charlotte Mitchell and Norman Bird. It was written by Richard Waring and produced and directed by Peter Frazer-Jones. Roger Webb wrote the theme song, "Bright Idea" (from the DeWolfe production music album, Awakening (DWS/LP 3302).

Storyline
The series depicted the life of Elizabeth Jones (Paula Wilcox), a young woman coming to terms with the responsibility of looking after her baby, Rolland 'Rollie' Jones (full name: Rolland Desmond Geoffrey Alan Jones), alone. Emotional support came in the form of next-door-neighbour and friend Geoffrey (Christopher Beeny). Difficulties included the reproaches of her parents (played by Charlotte Mitchell and Norman Bird), a difficult social life, and a reduced income.

A US made version was Miss Winslow and Son; this short-lived version ran for six episodes on CBS in 1979.

Episodes
Series One (1977)
From Here to Maternity (18 April 1977)
Baby Talk (25 April 1977)
A Kid for Three Fathers (2 May 1977)
For What We Are Not about to Receive (16 May 1977) – Some websites and the DVD release list this episode as being broadcast on 9 May 1977. This was a planned transmission date, however it and the following episodes were postponed at the last minute by a week owing to the ITV transmission of Granada Television's documentary 21 Up.
Baptism Under Fire (23 May 1977)
And Father Came Too (30 May 1977)

Series Two (1978)
More Fish in the Sea (9 January 1978)
A Theme in Two Flats (16 January 1978)
Will You Be My Wife (23 January 1978)
Jobs for the Girls (30 January 1978)
Just Good Friends (6 February 1978)
Four Part Harmony (13 February 1978)

Cast list

DVD release 

The complete series of Miss Jones and Son is available on DVD in the UK.

References

External links

ITV sitcoms
1970s British sitcoms
1977 British television series debuts
1978 British television series endings
Television shows produced by Thames Television
Television series by Fremantle (company)
English-language television shows